People Keep Talking is the debut studio album by American hip hop recording artist Hoodie Allen. It was announced on August 19 with a pre-order date of August 25 and a release date of October 14, 2014. The album features 14 tracks.

Release and promotion
People Keep Talking was available to stream through iTunes First Play on October 7, 2014. The album was officially released on October 14, 2014 on iTunes, becoming Allen's second album to do so where it reached the number two spot on the albums chart. The album was also released through physical CDs which was his first work to be released that way. One review declared the album release "expertly promoted" and remarked that Hoodie is a "marketing whiz" due to the release of high quality music videos for majority of the songs. Promoting the release, Hoodie performed "All About It" on Good Day Philadelphia.

Reception
A reviewer from Muhlenberg Weekly wrote that People Keep Talking is Hoodie's best work to date and "showed off his fast flow and clever lines".

Commercial performance
The album debuted at number eight on the Billboard 200 chart, with sales of 30,246 copies in the United States.

The fourth single off the album, "All About It" featuring Ed Sheeran, peaked at number 71 on the Billboard Hot 100 chart The song also charted around Europe, peaking in the top ten in Germany and Austria.

Track listing

Notes
 denotes a co-producer.
 denotes an additional producer.

Sample credit
 "People Keep Talking" contains an interpolation of "Between the Sheets", written by E. Isley, M. Isley, O.K. Isley, R. Isley, R. Isley, and C. Jasper.

Personnel 
Credits for People Keep Talking adapted from AllMusic.

 Miles Arntzer – horn arrangements
 Battle Roy – instrumentation, producer
 Nick Bilardello – art direction
 Jared Evan – producer, vocals, vocals 
 RJ Ferguson – producer
 Chris Gehringer – mastering
 Ian Gottshalk – guitar
 Jairus Holt – engineer
 Hoodie Allen – primary artist
 !llmind – producer
 Alex 'AK' Kresovich – producer

 Steven Markowitz – A&R
 Raymond Mason – brass
 Jason Mater – guitar, producer
 Max – featured artist
 Dylan McDougle – additional production, engineer, mixing
 Jay O'Byrne – art direction
 Wade Ridenhour – additional production, piano
 Craig Rosen – A&R
 Angelica Salem – vocals 
 Max Schneider – vocals
 Ed Sheeran – featured artist
 Matt Vogel – photography
 Jas Walton – saxophone
 Parrish Warrington –  producer
 Dan Weston – mixing
 Alex Wiley – featured artist

Charts

Weekly charts

Year-end charts

References

2014 albums
Hoodie Allen albums